David Wishart Torrance (born 22 June 1924) is a retired Church of Scotland minister and part of the well-known Torrance family of theologians and Christian ministers. He is the youngest of six children to Rev Thomas Torrance (1871–1959) and Annie Elizabeth Torrance (1883–1980), both missionaries to Chengdu, Sichuan of West China. Like his two brothers, Thomas F. Torrance and James B. Torrance, David became a church minister in the Church of Scotland. Unlike his two brothers, he did not go onto academic work. David continued in church ministry until his retirement in 1991.

References

See also
 Torrance family

1924 births
Living people
Christian writers
20th-century Ministers of the Church of Scotland
Alumni of the University of Edinburgh
University of Basel alumni